Ashley Taylor Gerren (July 6, 1990 – April 11, 2021), known professionally as Gerren Taylor, appeared on the BET reality series Baldwin Hills and the documentary America the Beautiful in 2007, which took a critical look at the United States obsession with beauty.

Early life 
Gerren was born in Los Angeles, California. She started modeling when she was 12 years old after a talent scout spotted her in Los Angeles Park. She was the youngest model the runway division of L.A. Models has ever signed. Taylor also signed with the Ford Modeling Agency and was booked by the designers Tracy Reese, Tommy Hilfiger and Betsey Johnson.

Filmography

References

External links

Female models from California
1990 births
2021 deaths
Models from Los Angeles
Place of death missing
21st-century American women